Robert "Bob" Buchanan is an American curler from Superior, Wisconsin.

He joined Somerville again a decade later, this time as coach for Somerville's bronze medal winning 1992 Olympic team.

Teams

References

External links
 

Living people
American male curlers
American curling champions
American curling coaches
Sportspeople from Superior, Wisconsin
Year of birth missing (living people)